Ingerid Vardund (24 April 1927 – 25 December 2006) was a Norwegian actress. She was known to the Norwegian audience primarily for her roles in the films Jentespranget (1973) and the sit-com  (1980). For her role in Jentespranget, she won the award for Best Actress at the 8th Moscow International Film Festival.

Vardund debuted on stage in 1947 at the Chat Noir, and on the screen five years later with the movie Andrine og Kjell. In 1971 she toured in Japan with Nationaltheatret (the National Theatre) as Nora in A Doll's House. She acted in a number of movies, and worked at Nationaltheatret from 1958 to 1993.

Selected filmography
 No Man's Woman (1953) as Mimmi
 Hjem går vi ikke (1955) as car workshop owner's girlfriend
 5 loddrett (1959) as the nightclub singer Anita Daae
 Sønner av Norge (1961) as Eva Wikdahl, the dentist
 Lina's Wedding (1973)  as Lina
 Over grensen (1987) as Rakel Feldmann

References

External links 

 
  VG: Ingerid Vardund is dead

1927 births
2006 deaths
Norwegian stage actresses
Norwegian musical theatre actresses
Norwegian film actresses
Norwegian television actresses
20th-century Norwegian actresses
Actresses from Oslo